Endless Legend is a turn based 4X fantasy-strategy game developed by Amplitude Studios and published by Iceberg Interactive for Microsoft Windows and Mac OS X in September 2014. The purpose of the game is to dominate the world of Auriga with one of the fourteen races/factions through either diplomacy or war while developing new technologies, exploring new lands and founding new cities.

Endless Legend is the second game made by Amplitude Studios in their Endless series of titles, following Endless Space.

The game was later published by Sega after they acquired Amplitude Studios.

Gameplay
Endless Legend is a turn-based 4X strategy game, in which players take control of a fantasy faction to establish an empire through exploration, conquest, diplomacy and research. The game is set in the land of Auriga, with the layout of its landmass and ecosystems being randomized per game, represented on a model-like map made up of a hexagonal grid.

The map is populated with a variety of terrain, each made up of biomes within the world which have effects on the player's units. Tiles and their layout are all randomly generated to create a unique playable world with each separate playthrough.

Fog of war covers the play space requiring exploration by the player's units to find resources, minor factions, and races that players must utilize and exploit to benefit their growing empires.

Unlike other 4X games, the world map of Endless Legend is formed of separate regions. Once a city has been established within the borders of a region for the first time, the entire region becomes part of a faction's territory and control. At the start of each game, each faction begins with a settler unit to establish their first city and region. Regions can only host one city each within their borders.

Faction
Players can choose from one of the fourteen available factions, each with their own unique characteristics including appearance, units, abilities and play-styles:

Wild Walkers: Former forest dwellers who have harnessed magic to control and shape the natural world.
Broken Lords: Knights of honor and chivalry who have lost their humanity, remaining as specters within their suits of armor.
Vaulters: Great smiths and craftsmen who have lived in solitude underground for most of the history prior.
Mezari: Space settlers who must adapt the best they can to Auriga's terrestrial conditions due to a loss of their ship and technology.
Necrophages: A great hive mind of insectoid creatures that can spread plagues while infecting and controlling others.
Ardent Mages: Sorcerers who warp their bodies and minds to achieve great magical power and sustained life.
Roving Clans: Travelers and merchants from distant lands of a nomadic tradition.
Drakken: An ancient dragon race whose longevity has made them a wise race of scholars and diplomats.
Cult of the Eternal End: A fanatical cult that spreads influence on lesser races, mechanical in their appearance and thought, who wish to destroy the relics of the Endless, the advanced alien race that once counted Auriga among the planets under their possession.

The following factions have been added in game expansions (denoted in parentheses):

Forgotten (Shadows): Survivors from a "thought to be extinct faction" embracing the shadows by specializing into deception, infiltration, and sabotage.
Allayi (Shifters): Ancient beings from the time of the Endless who change form with the seasons and hold a tight bond with Auriga.
Morgawr (Tempest): Ancient underwater folk who rose from the depths of Auriga.
Kapaku (Inferno): Emigrants forced from their volcanic homeworld who seek to transform Auriga into a 'paradise of ash and fire'.
Mykara (Symbiosis): A race of fungal humanoids who arose with the newly awakened Urkans.

Resources
Faction controlled cities are used to generate resources, construct buildings and recruit armies. There are five different key resources each faction requires to remain stable and grow: food, industry, dust, science, and influence.

 Food is used to increase and sustain the population.
 Industry is used to produce units and buildings.
 Dust is the standard currency in Auriga.
 Science is used for research.
 Influence is used for empire level actions, in which the player gains boons like a boosted attack on units or additional resource gain. Influence is also required for diplomatic proposals with other factions.

Resources are gained through the properties on game world tiles within a city's border, buildings the player has constructed and research. How much of a resource a city can gather is dictated by a city's workforce, gained by its native population, which can grow.

Workers are the main tool for gaining resources. They are placed to collect certain resources for the player, with more workers on a certain task gaining more resources.

Research
Another aspect of Endless Legend is the progression of research. Research is cut into four areas within multiple eras. The four areas of research are military, science and industry, empire and expansion, and economy and population. Each aspect is intended to tailor the experience to the player and pushes toward that player's specific goal of victory.

Cities
Cities are where armies are raised. Armies are composed of individual units spawned by the player, with different units types having their own abilities and uses in combat. Players move armies through an action points system. Each movement and interaction subtracts one action point until the counter hits zero, at which point no further actions can be taken. The units are used for exploration, combat, diplomacy, and questing. Units in an army can be outfitted with different equipment researched and purchased by the player or found. Acquired equipment can change the statistics of a units to the player's liking. Armies can also include a hero, a powerful unit with the ability to gain skill points to temper the character to a player's playstyle.

Quest
Endless Legend also has a quest system where quests are found in the game world. Many of these are completed through the use of armies. Quests differ between factions and are the main source of story content throughout the game. Completing all of the player's chosen faction's quests is also one possible victory condition for a player. Armies can accomplish quests given by other faction for diplomacy points. Diplomacy is used to gain favor with other faction, and if enough influence points are gained alliances can be formed. On the other hand, a declaration of war between the player and another faction can also occur if a player helps that faction's enemy. Outside of both peace and war, all players begin in a state of "cold war".

Win conditions
There are nine win conditions in the game:
Quest Victory: completing all of the faction's quests and the epilogue quest.
Elimination Victory: no other faction is left alive.
Score victory: having the highest number of overall points at the end of the 300th turn in a normal game.
Expansion Victory: 80% of the map is claimed by a player.
Economic Victory: in a normal game, 555.500 Dust has been collected by a player.
Diplomatic Victory: in a normal game, collecting 3000 Diplomatic Points.
Wonder Victory: completing all of the faction's quests and building the associated Wonder.
Scientific Victory: the player must discover five of six technologies in the 6th era.
Supremacy Victory: be the only remaining player in control of their starting capital.

Reception

Endless Legend received positive reviews from critics. Review aggregation website Metacritic gathered an average rating of 82 out of 100 based on 35 reviews for the PC version. and GameRankings gathered a score of 83% based on 20 reviews.

PC Gamer US gave it an 89 out of 100: "Amplitude Studios has created another astounding story-driven game, that really has taken the best bits of RTS, RPG, and 4X, drawing much from Endless Space, and spun it differently for every faction". IGN commented: "It combines style, substance, and setting into a marvelous overall experience for both empire management and tactical combat", giving it an 8.3 out of 10. GameSpot warned of passive and weak AI but remarked, "Endless Legends driving forces are so thoroughly executed that it serves as an imperfect, but well worthwhile step in the series, and hopefully a sign of things to come", giving it an 8 out of 10.

Rock, Paper, Shotgun named Endless Legend Game of the Year in 2014.

References

External links 

 Official website
 Endless Legend wiki

2014 video games
4X video games
Amplitude Studios games
Early access video games
Fantasy video games
Iceberg Interactive games
MacOS games
Multiplayer and single-player video games
Sega video games
Turn-based strategy video games
Video games developed in France
Video games with Steam Workshop support
Windows games